Erik Alexander Jazet (born 19 July 1971 in Schiedam) is a former Dutch field hockey player, who played 308 international matches for the Netherlands. The defender made his debut for the Dutch on 17 November 1990 in a match against England.

He competed at three Olympic Games, and won two golden medals (1996 and 2000) and a bronze (2004. In the Dutch League Jazet played for HC Bloemendaal and Stichtse Cricket en Hockey Club. He became the first team coach for Bloemendaal women in 2005.

External links
 
 Dutch Hockey Federation

1971 births
Living people
Dutch male field hockey players
Male field hockey defenders
Olympic field hockey players of the Netherlands
Field hockey players at the 1996 Summer Olympics
1998 Men's Hockey World Cup players
Field hockey players at the 2000 Summer Olympics
2002 Men's Hockey World Cup players
Field hockey players at the 2004 Summer Olympics
Dutch field hockey coaches
Olympic gold medalists for the Netherlands
Olympic silver medalists for the Netherlands
Sportspeople from Schiedam
Olympic medalists in field hockey
Medalists at the 2004 Summer Olympics
Medalists at the 2000 Summer Olympics
Medalists at the 1996 Summer Olympics
HC Bloemendaal players
SCHC players
20th-century Dutch people
21st-century Dutch people